Paelaid is an island belonging to the country of Estonia.

Paelaid is administered by Saare County.

See also
List of islands of Estonia

Saaremaa Parish
Islands of Estonia